The VIDC1 was a Video Display Controller chip created as an accompanying chip to the ARM CPU used in Acorn Archimedes computer systems. Its successor, the VIDC20, was later used in RiscPCs.

Video
The VIDC1 offers colour depths of 1, 2, 4 or eight bits per colour, allowing for 2, 4, 16 and 256 colour displays (the VIDC20 can offer up to approximately 16 million colours). A colour lookup table or palette register set of 16 12-bit words was provided, offering a range of 4096 colours for each of the colours in those displays or modes employing up to 16 colours. The 12 bits were split in three 4-bit RGB values, with a 4-bit high speed D/A converter for each of the three primary colours. However, in 256 colour modes, 4 bits of the colour data were hardware derived and could not be adjusted. The net result was 256 colours, covering a range of the 4096 available colours.

Since the device had no horizontal sync interrupt, it was difficult to display additional colours by changing the palette for each scan line, but not impossible, thanks to the 2 MHz IOC timer 1. Many demos managed to display 4096 colours on screen, or in a sense more through dithering.

The timing generator was fully programmable, and could be clocked with an 8 to 24 MHz clock. Resolutions that could be supported were 1024x1024 in monochrome, 640x512 in 16 colors, or 640x256 in 256 colors.

It had also one hardware 32-pixel wide sprite with unlimited height (by default used for the mouse pointer), where each pixel is coded in two bits: value 0 is for transparency, and the three others are freely chosen from the 4096 colour palette.

Sound
The VIDC also supported eight-channel stereo logarithmic 8-bit PWM sound.

References

Graphics chips
Acorn Computers
RISC OS